The vice president of the Islamic Republic of Afghanistan was the second highest political position attainable in the Islamic Republic of Afghanistan. The vice presidents were elected on the same ticket as the president. A presidential candidate was responsible for nominating two candidates for vice president before the election.

Although Sardar Mohammad Dawood Khan was the founder of the Republic in Afghanistan and the first president of Afghanistan; however, the position of Vice president was, for the first time, created in Afghanistan by King Amanullah Khan when he declared a constitutional monarchy in 1926 and established the position of "Yawar" (later " Deputy") and appointed Mahmoud Khan Shaghasi as the "First Deputy Assistant" (later "Vice president") as the first appointee of this position.

Republic of Afghanistan (1973—1978)

Democratic Republic of Afghanistan
The deputy head of state was the vice chairman (or vice president) of the Revolutionary Council between April 1978 and April 1988.

Republic of Afghanistan
Vice presidents were appointed after the new constitution and elections took place. 
Four vice presidents were appointed by president and approved by the National Assembly.

Islamic State of Afghanistan
Vice presidents were appointed by the president.

Afghan Interim Administration
During the Afghan Interim Administration and the Afghan Transitional Administration, when the Loya Jirga hadn't appointed a new Constitution yet, there were more than two vice chairmen of the interim administration.

Islamic Republic of Afghanistan
After 2004, vice presidents are elected on the same ticket as the president.

See also
List of current vice presidents

References

External links
 Vice Presidents of Afghanistan

Afghanistan